First-person shooter is a video game genre.

First-person shooter may also refer to:

 "First Person Shooter" (The X-Files), an episode of The X-Files
 "First Person Shooter", a song by Celldweller from Soundtrack for the Voices in My Head Vol. 02

See also
First-person shooter engine, a type of video game engine
Massively multiplayer online first-person shooter